Brissopsis zealandiae is a species of sea urchins of the family Brissidae. Their armour is covered with spines. Brissopsis zealandiae was first scientifically described in 1921 by Ole Theodor Jensen Mortensen.

References 

Animals described in 1921
zealandiae
Taxa named by Ole Theodor Jensen Mortensen